Cheilea dormitoria is a species of small limpet-like sea snail, a marine gastropod mollusk in the family Hipponicidae, the hoof snails.

Description

Distribution

References

 Drivas, J.; Jay, M. (1987). Coquillages de La Réunion et de l'Île Maurice. Collection Les Beautés de la Nature. Delachaux et Niestlé: Neuchâtel. . 159 pp.

External links
 Reeve L.A. (1858). Monograph of the genus Calyptraea. In: Conchologia Iconica, vol. 11, pl. 1-8 and unpaginated text. L. Reeve & Co., London

Hipponicidae
Gastropods described in 1858